Jan II may refer to:

 Jan II of Oświęcim (c. 1344/51 – 1376)
 John II, Duke of Opava-Ratibor (after 1365 – 1424)
 Jan II the Mad (1435–1504)
 Jan II the Good (c. 1460 – 1532)
 Jan II Kazimierz Vasa (1609–1672), King of Poland